Nazareth Village is an open-air museum in Nazareth, Israel, that reconstructs and reenacts village life in the Galilee in the time of Jesus.

History 
The village was founded in 2000 by the EMMS Nazareth Hospital. It features houses, terraced  fields, wine and olive presses all built to resemble those that would have been in a Galilee village in the 1st century. Muslim and Christian living history enactors dress in period costume and show visitors how farm, domestic, and craft work was performed two thousand years ago.

See also
Tourism in Israel
Jesus Trail

References

External links
 Nazareth village website

Buildings and structures in Nazareth
Christianity in Nazareth
History museums in Israel
Museums in Northern District (Israel)
Open-air museums
Outdoor structures in Israel